The Methodist Church was the major Methodist denomination in Canada from its founding in 1884 until it merged with two other denominations to form the United Church of Canada in 1925. The Methodist Church was itself formed from the merger of four smaller Methodist denominations with ties to British and US Methodist denominations.

History

Laurence Coughlan was a lay preacher of the British Methodist movement. He arrived in Newfoundland in 1766 and began working among Protestant English and Irish settlers.  In 1779  William Black, born in England but raised in Nova Scotia was converted to Methodism and commenced evangelizing in the Maritimes, his work falling under the supervision of the British Wesleyan Methodist Church in 1800. In 1855 this body formed the Wesleyan Methodist Conference of Eastern British America.

Under the leadership of William Losee, meanwhile, the Methodist Episcopal Church in the US, established on Christmas Day in 1784, began work in 1791 among British immigrants to Upper Canada. By 1828 the Methodist Episcopal work in Canada had formally severed ties with the US. In 1833 most of it joined with the British Wesleyans to form the Wesleyan Methodist Church in Canada, adding to itself the Methodist people of Lower Canada in 1854. That part of it which absented itself from the union re-formed into the Methodist Episcopal Church of Canada in 1834, eventually growing into the second largest Methodist body in Canada.

In turn the Wesleyan Methodist Church in Canada and the Wesleyan Methodist Conference of Eastern British America united in 1874, annexing as well the Methodist New Connexion Church in Canada (itself an amalgam of several small groups), thereby forming the Methodist Church of Canada.

In 1884 this body joined with the Methodist Episcopal Church in Canada, together with the Bible Christian Church of Canada and the Primitive Methodist Church in Canada, bringing to birth the Methodist Church, with churches in Canada, Newfoundland (which at the time was not part of the Canadian Confederation) and Bermuda. This lattermost union made the Methodist Church the largest Protestant denomination in Canada. It now included all Canadian Methodists with the exception of several very small groups: the British Methodist Episcopal Church (a development of the African Methodist Episcopal Church serving chiefly people of colour), two German-speaking bodies (the Evangelical Association and the United Brethren in Christ), and the Free Methodist Church (a body that had begun in New York State in 1860 and extended itself into Canada.)

Merger to form the United Church of Canada
In 1925, the Methodist Church united with 70% of the Presbyterian Church in Canada and 96% of the Congregational Union of Canada to form The United Church of Canada.  The Methodist Church with its notable benefactors the Eaton and Massey families was the sponsor of Victoria College at the University of Toronto, once and still a mainstay of intellectual rigour at that university, and the alma mater of many of Canada's leaders and most famous thinkers.

Although Methodists were never a majority of anglophone Canadians or even Torontonians, they exerted significant political and social influence in southern Ontario, particularly in Toronto. Many of the causes espoused by and associated with the United Church in the 20th century were, although also associated with other Evangelical Protestant denominations, especially Methodist ones, in particular Sabbatarianism, temperance, the rights of women and missions to the aboriginal peoples of Canada.

Although Methodism in Canada abandoned that label in 1925, many United Church people in Canada are entirely unaware of the term. The foremost Canadian Methodist, Egerton Ryerson, is commemorated by the numerous Ryerson United Churches across the country.

See also

 Henry Flesher Bland
 Albert Carman
 Samuel Dwight Chown
 James Woodsworth
 Canadian Methodist Mission

Notes

References

Further reading 
 Emery, George. Methodist Church on the Prairies, 1896–1914 (McGill-Queen's Press-MQUP, 2001).
 French, Goldwin. Parsons and Politics: The rôle of the Wesleyan Methodists in Upper Canada and the Maritimes from 1780 to 1855 (Ryerson Press, 1962).
 Hollett, Calvin. Shouting, Embracing, and Dancing with Ecstasy: The Growth of Methodism in Newfoundland, 1774–1874 (McGill-Queen's Press-MQUP, 2010)
 McLaren, Scott. Pulpit, Press, and Politics: Methodists and the Market for Books in Upper Canada (University of Toronto Press, 2019).
Platt, Harriet Louise The Story Of The Years: A History Of The Woman's Missionary Society Of The Methodist Church, Canada, From 1881 To 1906 (1908) online
 Selles, Johanna. Methodists and women's education in Ontario, 1836–1925 (McGill-Queen's Press-MQUP, 1996)
 Semple, Neil. Lord's Dominion: The History of Canadian Methodism (McGill-Queen's Press-MQUP, 1996)
 Smith, Thomas Watson History of the Methodist Church Within the Territories Embraced in the Late Conference of Eastern British America: Including Nova Scotia, New Brunswick, Prince Edward Island and Bermuda (1977) online
 Van Die, Marguerite. Evangelical Mind: Nathanael Burwash and the Methodist Tradition in Canada, 1839–1918 (McGill-Queen's Press-MQUP, 1989)
 Webb, Todd. Transatlantic Methodists: British Wesleyanism and the Formation of an Evangelical Culture in Nineteenth-Century Ontario and Quebec (McGill-Queen's Press-MQUP, 2013).
 Webster, Thomas. History of the Methodist Episcopal Church in Canada  (1870) online
 Whiteley, Marilyn Färdig. Canadian Methodist Women, 1766–1925: Marys, Marthas, Mothers in Israel (Wilfrid Laurier Univ. Press, 2005)

Methodism in Canada
Canada
Former Methodist denominations